The Guardian of Darkness (aka Le Gardien des ténèbres) is a French action game developed and published by Cryo Interactive in 1999. 

The player takes the role of a monk at an occult organisation who must face and defeat supernatural entities. The game has CGI graphics, with the camera placed behind the player's body. While mostly an action title, it has adventure elements in terms of investigating and locating objects via point-and-click. The game includes 10 missions in total, which the player must complete to beat the game.

Critical reception 

JeuxVideo not only thought it as a bad game, but was disappointed at the consistently low quality of titles being pumped out by Cryo at this point in time. Gry Online highlighted the vast array of locations the player gets to visit through their travels. Meristation felt that while the game was not particularly innovative, it was still enjoyable. Game Over Online praised the game's originality, hoping that other developers took note.

References

External links 

1999 video games
Action video games
Cryo Interactive games
Europe-exclusive video games
PlayStation (console) games
Point-and-click adventure games
Video games developed in France
Windows games